Jean Manse (1899–1967) was a French screenwriter. He was the brother of Henriette Manse, and brother-in-law of Fernandel with whom he frequently collaborated. He was also a lyricist, working with composer Henri Betti on the hit Christmas song C'est Noël.

Selected filmography
 Ernest the Rebel (1938)
 Berlingot and Company (1939)
 St. Val's Mystery (1945)
 Casimir (1951)
 The Sleepwalker (1951)
 Forbidden Fruit (1952)
 Spring, Autumn and Love (1955)
 Honoré de Marseille (1956)
 Don Juan (1956)
 The Lord's Vineyard (1958)
 Cocagne (1961)
 Dynamite Jack (1961)
 The Changing of the Guard (1962)
 The Trip to Biarritz (1963)

References

Bibliography 
 Klossner, Michael. The Europe of 1500-1815 on Film and Television: A Worldwide Filmography of Over 2550 Works, 1895 Through 2000. McFarland & Company, 2002.

External links 
 

1899 births
1967 deaths
20th-century French screenwriters
Mass media people from Marseille